John Wilson (born 11 April 1952) is an English former footballer who played as a midfielder in the Football League for Darlington and in non-league football for Consett and Gateshead.

References

1952 births
Living people
Sportspeople from Jarrow
Footballers from Tyne and Wear
English footballers
Association football midfielders
Consett A.F.C. players
Darlington F.C. players
Gateshead F.C. players
English Football League players